Macclesfield railway station serves Macclesfield, Cheshire, England.

Macclesfield railway station may also refer to:

Macclesfield railway station (Macclesfield, Bollington and Marple Railway), a former station
Macclesfield Hibel Road railway station, a former station

See also
Macclesfield (disambiguation)